Berkswich is a civil parish in the Borough of Stafford, Staffordshire, England.  It contains eight listed buildings that are recorded in the National Heritage List for England. All the listed buildings are designated at Grade II, the lowest of the three grades, which is applied to "buildings of national importance and special interest".  The parish contains the village of Milford, and Baswich, a suburb of the town of Stafford.  The Staffordshire and Worcestershire Canal passes through the parish, and the listed buddings associated with this are two accommodation bridges and an aqueduct.  The other listed buildings are a timber framed cottage, a large house, a road bridge, a smithy, and a pair of lodges at the entrance to Shugborough Park.


Buildings

References

Citations

Sources

Lists of listed buildings in Staffordshire